Pelargoderus basalis is a species of beetle in the family Cerambycidae. It was described by Charles Joseph Gahan in 1907, originally under the genus Epepeotes.

References

basalis
Beetles described in 1907